Friedrich "Fritz" Hilpert (born 31 May 1956) is a member of the electropop group Kraftwerk.

Background 
Fritz Hilpert studied trumpet and percussion at the Musisches Max-Reger-Gymnasium, Germany, until 1976. He also played drums in several live bands at that time.

From 1978 he studied sound engineering at the Musikhochschule Rheinland and the FH Düsseldorf. In 1986 he received his Diplom-Ingenieur qualification (the German equivalent of a Master of Science degree) in sound and image technology.

He worked as freelance sound engineer with several German acts as the new wave-band Din A Testbild before becoming associated with Kraftwerk in 1989.

In addition to studio work, he replaced Wolfgang Flür in concert when Kraftwerk resumed their touring activities in 1990, and engineered the album The Mix, released in 1991.

He has made musical contributions to Kraftwerk's compositions since "Expo 2000" in 1999. He is credited as a co-composer on most of the tracks on the album Tour de France Soundtracks.
Along with Henning Schmitz he works as sound programmer and engineer at Kling Klang studio and is administrator of the Kraftwerk.com and Klingklang.com websites.

While on tour with Kraftwerk in Australia, where the band were to be Global Gathering headliners, Fritz Hilpert fell ill and was believed to have suffered some sort of heart failure. This forced Kraftwerk to cancel the Melbourne show on 22 November 2008, but Hilpert was cleared to fly and continue the tour the next day.

References

Kraftwerk members
Living people
1956 births
People from Amberg